Vincent John DiCalogero (born July 25, 1950) is an American former handball player who competed in the 1972 Summer Olympics and in the 1976 Summer Olympics.

He was born in New York City.

In 1972 he was part of the American team which finished 14th in the Olympic tournament. He played two matches and scored one goal.

Four years later he finished tenth with the American team in the 1976 Olympic tournament. He played all five matches and scored three goals again.

He played for the Adelphi University.

Vincent has 4 children who all competed in College Athletics.  Amy (University of Scranton - Tennis, 1998), Jill (William and Mary - Track and Field, 2000), Beth (University of Richmond - Lacrosse, 2002) and John (University of Kansas - Track and Field, 2005)

References

External links
 profile

1950 births
Living people
American male handball players
Olympic handball players of the United States
Handball players at the 1972 Summer Olympics
Handball players at the 1976 Summer Olympics
Sportspeople from New York City